A sloppy joe is a sandwich consisting of ground beef, onions, tomato sauce or ketchup, Worcestershire sauce, and other seasonings, served on a hamburger bun. There are several theories about the sandwich's origin.

History

Early and mid-20th century American cookbooks offer plenty of sloppy joe-type recipes, though they go by different names: Toasted Deviled Hamburgers, Chopped Meat Sandwiches, Spanish Hamburgers, Hamburg a la Creole, Beef Mironton, and Minced Beef Spanish Style.

One theory of the sandwich's origin is that in 1917, Havana, Cuba, bar owner José "Sloppy Joe" Abeal y Otero created "a simple sandwich filled with ground beef stewed in tomatoes." This was possibly his interpretation of ropa vieja. His bar was reportedly frequented by Americans and Britons, including Errol Flynn, Ernest Hemingway, and Graham Greene. Circa 1937, Hemingway convinced Joe Russell, a bar owner in Key West, Florida, to rename his Silver Slipper bar Sloppy Joe's.

Marilyn Brown, director of the consumer test kitchen at H.J. Heinz in Pittsburgh, says their research at the Carnegie Library suggests that the sloppy joe's origins lie with the "loose meat sandwiches" sold in Sioux City, Iowa, in the 1930s and were the creation of a cook named Joe.

A 1940 advertisement illustrates another use for the term "Sloppy Joe;" a women's cardigan sweater, described as "ever popular."

References to sloppy joes as sandwiches begin by the 1940s. One example from Ohio is a 1944 Coshocton Tribune ad under the heading Good Things to Eat' says 'Sloppy Joes' – 10c – Originated in Cuba – You'll ask for more – The Hamburg Shop" and elsewhere on the same page, "Hap is introducing that new sandwich at The Hamburg Shop – Sloppy Joes – 10c".

Food companies began producing packaged sloppy joe, in cans with meat, or just the sauce, such as Manwich, by the 1960s.

A 1975 Dictionary of American Slang defines sloppy joe as any cheap restaurant or lunch counter serving cheap food quickly.

Variations
Several variations of the sloppy joe exist in North America. In Quebec, Canada, sandwiches of stewed ground beef such as pain à la viande and pain fourré gumbo are usually served on hot dog buns. A similar sandwich, the "dynamite", exists in the area around Woonsocket, Rhode Island, and is distinguished by the use of onions, bell peppers, and sometimes celery.

Stewed meat sandwiches are common in several other culinary traditions as well. The rou jia mo, from China's Shaanxi Province, consists of stewed pork, beef, or lamb on "baijimo", a type of flatbread. Keema pav of Indian cuisine uses a pav (from Portuguese "pão", a country-style soft roll) bread roll filled with keema, a minced, stewed, curried meat.

In some stores in northern New Jersey, an unrelated sandwich made with a combination of deli meat, such as turkey, roast beef or especially pastrami, with coleslaw, Russian dressing and Swiss cheese on three slices of rye bread is also known as a sloppy joe.

See also

 Barbecue sandwich
 Chili burger
 Picadillo
 Keema
 List of American foods
 List of American sandwiches
 List of sandwiches

References

Further reading
 

American sandwiches
Beef sandwiches
Meat-based sauces